Ludovic Joseph Obraniak (born 10 November 1984) is a football manager and former professional footballer. He primarily played as an attacking midfielder. Born in France, he played for the Poland national team. He was appointed to his first head coach position, with French Championnat National 3 side Le Touquet in June 2021.

Club career

Metz
Obraniak began his football career with his local club FC Metz. Due to his consistent play in the reserves, he was quickly promoted to the senior side by then-manager Jean Fernandez making his debut during the 2003–04 season in a 2–0 loss to Bordeaux coming on as a late-match substitute wearing the number 13 shirt. Over the next two years, Metz showed their inconsistent play finishing 16th in 2004–05 and finishing dead bottom of the table in 2005–06, thus being relegated. Obraniak was the primary bright spot in the squad appearing in 61 matches and scoring three goals over those years.

With Metz in Ligue 2, several Ligue 1 clubs drew their interest over to Obraniak. Despite this, he still played half the season in Ligue 2 with Metz appearing in 20 matches and scoring two goals. The following winter would see his departure. After weeks of silent negotiating, Metz finally came to an agreement on 23 January 2007 with the Nord-Pas de Calais-based side Lille OSC. Metz received €1.2 million, as well as the Swiss striker Daniel Gygax.

Lille
Obraniak agreed to a four-year contract keeping him with the club until 2010. He made his debut with Lille four days later coming on substitute in a match against Bordeaux. He played in every remaining match that season, making on and off starts and substitute appearances. With Lille playing in the UEFA Champions League that season, he appeared in both legs of their knockout stage match against Manchester United. The following season, Obraniak had a solid season appearing in 35 matches and scoring two goals, though Lille finished out of Europe in the league standings. For the 2008–09 season, he got off to a fast start scoring 7 goals in only 16 appearances contributing to Lille's 5th-place position heading into the winter break. In later seasons, he was not a regular starter and decided to leave the club. He was however instrumental in helping Lille win the Ligue 1 and Coupe de France double in the 2010-11 season. In the 2011 Coupe de France Final he came on as a substitute for Moussa Sow and scored the winning goal to give Lille a 1–0 win over Paris Saint-Germain.

Bordeaux
On 12 January 2012, Obraniak signed a three-and-a-half-year contract with Ligue 1 outfit Bordeaux. In February, he scored two goals in a 5–4 away win against his former club Lille, including the winning goal in injury time.

Werder Bremen
In January 2014, Obraniak left France for the first time of his career and moved to German Bundesliga club Werder Bremen. He signed for two and a half years until summer 2016 and the transfer fee was believed to be €2 million. Prior to his decision for Werder, he consulted fellow Frenchman Johan Micoud who have had a great spell in Bremen in the 2000s. However, his time in Bremen did not become a success. After his signing he was a regular for eight matches but then he apparently lost favor with head coach Robin Dutt. Following Dutt's sacking in October 2014 he raised vainly hopes of improving his situation, also being left out of the squad in almost official matches under new coach Viktor Skrypnyk.

Çaykur Rizespor
In January 2015, he was loaned to Turkish Süper Lig club Çaykur Rizespor for the remainder of the season. Bremen granted them also a buy-out option for summer 2015. He made his league debut against Galatasaray on 25 January 2015.

Maccabi Haifa
On 27 August 2015, he signed for Israeli Premier League giants Maccabi Haifa, After passing a medical test, he signed a two-year contract worth €400,000 per year. On 12 September, Obraniak made his debut against Bnei Sakhnin FC.

On 24 May 2016, he scored the winning goal in the 2015–16 Israel State Cup final, against Maccabi Tel Aviv. On 17 August 2016, Obraniak was released from Maccabi Haifa after one year.

Retirement
On 4 October 2018, he announced his retirement as a player from football.

International career
Obraniak made an appearance for the France under-21 squad; however, since it was not a match for points FIFA did not consider him permanently capped. This was later confirmed by FIFA's decision to remove the age limit on nationality switches of players who had only been capped at youth level.

Due to having Polish roots through his grandfather, Zygmunt Obraniak who was from Pobiedziska in Poznań County, the player became the subject of interest from the Poland national football team and applied for citizenship of the country. Since his grandfather had never renounced Polish citizenship, according to Polish laws Obraniak's citizenship did not need to be granted by the Polish government but simply verified by the Masovian voivode. Obraniak was confirmed as a Polish citizen on 5 June 2009.

On 23 July 2009, he was officially called up to the Poland team by coach Leo Beenhakker for the squad's friendly against Greece, where Obraniak scored both goals in the match making a 2–0 victory for Poland.

He played in all three games for Poland at Euro 2012.

Managerial career
Obraniak was appointed head coach of Le Touquet on 5 June 2021.

Personal life
Obraniak's daughter was born on 1 June 2011.

Obraniak is fluent in French and English. Despite representing Poland on an international level, he does not speak Polish fluently.

Career statistics

Club

International goals
Scores and results list Poland's goal tally first, score column indicates score after each Obraniak goal.

Honours

Club
Lille
Ligue 1: 2010–11
Coupe de France: 2010–11

Bordeaux
Coupe de France: 2012–13

Maccabi Haifa
Israel State Cup: 2015–16

Individual
Coupe de France Final Man of the Match: 2011

References

External links
Lille OSC Profile

National team stats on the website of the Polish Football Association 

Living people
1984 births
Sportspeople from Moselle (department)
Polish footballers
Poland international footballers
Polish football managers
French footballers
France under-21 international footballers
French football managers
French people of Polish descent
Polish people of French descent
Citizens of Poland through descent
Association football midfielders
UEFA Euro 2012 players
Lille OSC players
FC Metz players
FC Girondins de Bordeaux players
SV Werder Bremen players
Çaykur Rizespor footballers
Maccabi Haifa F.C. players
AJ Auxerre players
Ligue 1 players
Ligue 2 players
Bundesliga players
Israeli Premier League players
Footballers from Grand Est
Expatriate footballers in Germany
Expatriate footballers in Israel
Expatriate footballers in Turkey
French expatriate sportspeople in Germany
French expatriate sportspeople in Israel
French expatriate sportspeople in Turkey
Polish expatriate sportspeople in Germany
Polish expatriate sportspeople in Israel
Polish expatriate sportspeople in Turkey